Villalpando may refer to:

People
Juan Bautista Villalpando (1552–1608), Spanish Jesuit architect and mathematician
Cristóbal de Villalpando (1649–1714), Mexican Baroque artist
Jorge Villalpando (born 1985), Mexican goalkeeper
Catalina Vasquez Villalpando (born 1940), 39th Treasurer of the United States

Places
Villalpando, municipality in Spain.